CS Ştiinţa Bacău is a women's handball club from Bacău, Romania, which plays in the Romanian First League of Women's Handball.

Kits

Honours
Liga Naţională:                           
Winners (9): 1979, 1980, 1982, 1983, 1984, 1985, 1986, 1987, 1992
Romanian Cup:
Winners (5): 1980, 1982, 1983, 1986, 1989
EHF Champions League:                           
Winners (0): 
Runners-up (1): 1985-86
EHF Cup Winners' Cup:                           
Winners (1): 1988-89

Famous players
 Narcisa Lecușanu
 Mariana Tîrcă
 Laura Chiper

External links
  
 

Romanian handball clubs
Sport in Bacău